Catherine Gund (born Catherine Gund Saalfield; 1965) is an Australian-born American producer, director, writer, and activist who founded Aubin Pictures in 1996. Gund's films have screened around the world in festivals, theaters, museums, and schools; on PBS, HBO, Paramount+/MTV Documentary Films, and the Discovery Channel, Sundance Channel, Netflix, and Amazon Prime.

Early life
Catherine Gund was born in Geelong, Australia but grew up in Ohio. She is the daughter of philanthropist Agnes Gund and her first husband, Albrecht "Brec" Saalfield. She attended Brown University and received a dual degree in Art/Semiotics and Women's Studies, and was a member of Phi Beta Kappa.

Career 
Upon graduation, Gund moved to New York City to do the Whitney Independent Study Program and joined ACT UP.  She co-founded DIVA TV (Damned Interfering Video Activist Television), the AIDS activist video collective affiliated with ACT UP/NY whose productions included Target City Hall, Pride ''''69-'89, Like a Prayer, and Stop the Church. During this time, she also became involved with Paper Tiger Television, a collectively produced weekly public access show, and contributed to shows from 1987-1994.
 Much of her early video work from this time is held at the New York Public Library as a part of their AIDS Activist Videotape Collection.

Gund's early activist video work focused on AIDS activism and the LGBTQ+ community. Her work in the early '90s included Bleach, Teach, and Outreach (1989, co-produced with Ray Navarro) to document the emergence of a city-sponsored needle exchange program to combat the spread of HIV; Keep Your Laws Off My Body (1990, co-produced with Zoe Leonard) about censorship and legislation against privacy and lesbian bodies; Among Good Christian Peoples (1991, co-produced with Jacqueline Woodson) based on Woodson’s humorous essay about growing up as a Black lesbian Jehovah’s Witness; I’m You, You’re Me: Women Surviving Prison Living with AIDS (1992, co-produced with Debbie Levine); Sacred Lies, Civil Truths (1993, co-produced with Cyrille Phipps) documents the insurgent Religious Right and its broad-based agenda, analyzes their campaigns for anti-gay initiatives in Oregon and Colorado in 1992, also examines issues of family and religion in lesbian and gay communities; Not Just Passing Through (1994, co-produced with Polly Thistlethwaite, Dolores Perez, Jean Carlomusto) a four-part documentary about constructions of lesbian history, community and culture; Cuz It's A Boy (1994, about the murder of Brandon Teena); Positive: Life with HIV (1993-1995, senior associate producer & segment producer) AIDSFILMS’ four hour series about HIV/AIDS targeted at the HIV community covering political, psycho-social, cultural, medical and legal issues of living with HIV/AIDS.

In 1996, Gund founded Aubin Pictures, a nonprofit documentary film company with scholar and activist Scot Nakagawa. She produced Aubin's first film, When Democracy Works (1996), that same year, in a three-part focus on stories of multi-issue organizing against the rising radical right's scapegoating and bigotry. Three years later, she produced and directed the feature documentary Hallelujah! Ron Athey: A Story of Deliverance (1998) about controversial and iconoclastic performance artist Ron Athey, and co-directed Object Lessons (1999) along with Catherine Lord, which uses the creation of a gallery exhibition to question received ideas about lesbian visibility, community, culture, and identity. In 2000 she produced On Hostile Ground, a documentary about three abortion providers working in the USA, in places where providers are scarce and abortion is avoided by most medical schools, hospitals, and doctors. It was broadcast on the Sundance Channel.    

In 2004, she produced Making Grace, documenting the journey of a lesbian couple having a baby together. Gund's documentary, A Touch of Greatness (2004), about the revolutionary teaching practices of elementary school teacher Albert Cullum, was nominated for a News and Documentary Emmy. The film also won Best Documentary award at Hamptons International Film Festival in 2004 . She produced Motherland Afghanistan in 2006 about an OB/GYN struggling to make a difference in his homeland of Afghanistan, first at Kabul's renamed Laura Bush Maternity Ward and then in an isolated provincial hospital where patients often travel for several days to get treatment. Broadcast on PBS/Independent Lens. In 2009, Gund produced and directed a segment for Sesame Street called Rhyme Time (2009) with poet Idris Goodwin about kids and healthy eating. What's On Your Plate? (2009), a documentary directed by Gund and two eleven-year-old girls about healthy, sustainable eating from a kid's perspective, premiered at the Berlin International Film Festival and was featured in the Discovery Channel's Planet Green . Born to Fly: Elizabeth Streb vs. Gravity (2014)  (formerly "How to Become an Extreme Action Hero") follows the life and work of choreographer Elizabeth Streb and was nominated for a News and Documentary Emmy award. Chavela (2017)  follows the life and legend of lesbian Mexican ranchera chanteuse Chavela Vargas. Dispatches from Cleveland (2017) about how communities in Cleveland united to fight for justice in the face of police violence after the death of Tamir Rice.Aggie (2020) is a feature-length documentary that explores the nexus of art, race, and justice through the story of her mother, powerhouse art collector Agnes "Aggie" Gund. The film chronicles Agnes Gund's stunning journey to sell a Roy Lichtenstein painting to invest in imagination and end mass incarceration through the Art for Justice Fund, fueling artists and activists at the forefront of the movement. The film premiered at the Sundance Film Festival in 2020 and was released theatrically in October 2020. Gund produced America (2018), a short film directed by Garrett Bradley. Gund produced Primera (2021), a feature-length documentary that tells the story of four parents-turned activists leading Chile's revolutionary path to a new constitution. (HBO)

She also produced Angola Do You Hear Us? Voices from a Plantation Prison (2022) (formerly A Peculiar Silence), a short film directed by Cinque Northern about Liza Jessie Peterson's shutdown 2020 performance of her acclaimed play "The Peculiar Patriot" at Angola, the Louisiana State Penitentiary, America's largest prison-plantation. (Paramount Plus/MTV Docs). The documentary examines what led to the shutdown of the performance, the material that confronted a system, and how the impact of Peterson's visit rippled through Angola long after the record of it was erased by prison authorities.            

Her archival footage has been featured in numerous TV Shows and films, including How to Survive a Plague, United in Anger, the 2012 documentary Koch, VICE Special Report: Countdown to Zero, Fauci (2022), Cured (2020), Larry Kramer in Love and Anger (2015). 

Gund currently serves on boards of several organizations including Art for Justice, Art Matters, Baldwin for the Arts and The George Gund Foundation. She also co-founded the Third Wave Foundation, an organization that resources youth-led, intersectional, gender justice movements. She was the founding director of BENT TV, the video workshop for LGBTQI youth, and was on the founding boards of Iris House, Working Films, Reality Dance Company, and The Sister Fund. Previously, Gund has served on the boards of Bard Early Colleges, Osa Conservation, MediaRights.org, The Robeson Fund of the Funding Exchange, The Vera List Center for Art and Politics at the New School, and the Astraea Foundation.

 Filmography Angola Do You Hear Us? Voices From a Plantation Prison (2022) - as producerPrimera (2021) - as producerAggie (2020) - as directorAmerica (2019) - as producerDispatches from Cleveland" (2017) - as director/producerChavela (2017) - as director/producerBORN TO FLY: Elizabeth Streb vs. Gravity (2014) - as director/producerWhat's On Your Plate? (2009) - as director/producerSesame Street: Rhyme Time (2009) - as director/producerMotherland Afghanistan (2006) - as producer Making Grace (2004) - as director/producerTouch of Greatness (2004) - as producer On Hostile Ground (2000) - as producerObject Lessons (1999) - as director/producerHallelujah! Ron Athey: A Story of Deliverance (1998) - as director/producer/cameraWhen Democracy Works (1996) - as director/producerPositive: Life with HIV (1993-1995) - as senior associate producer/segment producerCuz It's Boy (1994) - as director/producerWestern Artists/African Art: The Artists Speak (1994) - as producerNot Just Passing Through (1994) - director/producerB.U.C.K.L.E. (1993) - as director/producerSacred Lies, Civil Truths (1993) - director/producerI’m You, You’re Me: Women Surviving Prison Living with AIDS (1992) - as director/producerAIDS Activist Videotape Collection (1987 - 1992) documents the Montreal AIDS conference among other documents and candid encounters captured during the AIDS crisis. Among Good Christian Peoples (1991) - director/producerDIVA TV (1989-1991) includes "Target City Hall", "Pride", "Like a Prayer", "'69-'89", and "Stop the Church"Keep Your Laws Off My Body (1990) - director/producerEnds and Means (1990) Produced by Catherine Gund and DeeDee Halleck. Documents the proceedings of the Anti-Communism conference at Harvard University. Video.Bleach, Teach, and Outreach (1989) - director/producer (with Ray Navarro).Paper Tiger Television (1988)

 Awards 
 Breakthrough Award (nominee), Chicken and Egg Pictures, 2021, 2018
 Visual AIDS Vanguard Award, VAVA Voom, 2021
 Joan Shaw Herman Award for Distinguished Service, Concord Academy, 2017
 Educational Video Center Honoree, 2016
 John Dewey Award for Distinguished Public Service - Bard College, 2016
 Vision Award - New York Women's Foundation, 2015
 Cleveland Film Festival (CIFF) Someone to Watch Award, 2005

Selected bibliography

"Countering Philanthropic Fragility with Philanthropic Collaboration," Inside Philanthropy, September 9, 2021.
"Words of Art," (visual arts card game) Penguin Random House, April 13, 2021.
"Ruth Bader Ginsburg led by engaging others to act," Cleveland.com, October 16, 2020.
"No Object Is More Important Than People, Artists, Community and Love": Catherine Gund | Aggie, Filmmaker, January 24, 2020.
"3 Reflections on Cinema and Archives," (Vision & Justice Online) Aperture, Summer 2016.
"There are Many Ways to Say Hallelujah" in Pleading in the Blood: The Art and Performances of Ron Athey (2013)
"What’s On Your Plate? Kids And Their Families Talk About What They Eat, Where It Comes From and Why That Matters," with Mary Jeys and Cassie Wagler (2011)
"The Education of Young Donors is a Two-Way Street," in "The Chronicle of Philanthropy" (1999)
"To April Martin," in Letters of Intent: Women Cross the Generations to Talk about Family, Work, Sex, Love and The Future of Feminism, eds. Anna Bondoc and Meg Daily, The Free Press, 1999.
Interview with Amber Hollibaugh and Gini Reticker on P.O.V. distribution of Women and Children Last, in High Impact Television, The Center for Strategic Communications, 1998.
"Lucky," with Scot Nakagawa in Queerly Classed, ed. Susan Raffo (1997)
"Memorials" in Encyclopedia of AIDS: A Social, Political, Cultural, and Scientific Record of the Epidemic, ed. Raymond A. Smith (1997)
"Till Death Do Us Part" in Generation Q: Inheriting Stonewall, eds. Seth Silberman and Robin Bernstein (1996)
“November 1995” in XXXFruit, Summer 1996.
“Give Me My Dyke TV,” in Out in All Directions: The Almanac of Gay and Lesbian America, eds. Lynn Witt, Eric Marcus and Sherry Thomas, Warner Books, 1995.
“AIDS Videography,” in AIDS TV, by Alexandra Juhasz, Duke, 1995.
“You are doing here for us,” photo collage with Hanna Crespo, student at the Harvey Milk School, in XXXFruit, premiere issue: Witness: An Exquisite Corpse, Summer 1995.
“Follow the Leaders... Not the (AIDS) Czar,” feature article about Kristine Gebbie, Clinton’s former National AIDS Policy Coordinator, for MS. Magazine July 1994, unpublished due to Gebbie’s resignation.
“Coming to Safer Sex,” On Our Backs, a Blush Productions Publication, Jan-Feb 1994, (reprinted in Lesbian AIDS Project LAP Notes bulletin, May 1994).
“On the Make: Activist Video Collectives NYC, 1990,” in Queer Looks, eds. Pratibha Parmar, John Greyson, Martha Gever, Routledge, 1993.
“Jacqueline Woodson,” in Contemporary Lesbian Writers of the United States: A Bio-Bibliographical Critical Sourcebook, eds. Denise Knight, Sandra Pollack, 1993.
"Lesbian Marriage... (K)not!" in Sisters, Sexperts, Queers: Beyond the Lesbian Nation, ed. Arlene Stein, Plume (1993, reprinted from OUTWEEK #13, 1989)
"Shocking Pink Praxis: Race and Gender on the ACT UP Frontlines," with  Ray Navarro, in Inside/Out: Lesbian Theories, Gay Theories, ed. Diana Fuss (1991)Women, AIDS and Activism'', The ACT UP Women’s Book Collective (co-author) (1990)
Contributing Editor of The Independent Film and Video Monthly (1992-1996); Contributing Writer for On Our Backs (1994). Articles have also appeared in The Advocate, Outweek, NYQ, The Guardian, Lies of Our Times, The Chronicle of Philanthropy.

References

External links
 

1965 births
American film directors
American film producers
American LGBT artists
Living people
Brown University alumni
Members of ACT UP
21st-century LGBT people